Frutonic is a lightly carbonated soft drink made of juice and water by The Coca-Cola Company.  It is sold in Belgium, Luxembourg, and New Zealand. Flavors include lemon, orange and strawberry.

Coca-Cola brands